The 1998 Stanford Cardinal football team represented Stanford University in the 1998 NCAA Division I-A football season. The team was led by head coach Tyrone Willingham.

Schedule

Roster

Coaching staff
Tyrone Willingham – Head coach
Bill Diedrick – Offensive coordinator and quarterbacks
Earle Mosley – Running backs
Mose Rison – wide receivers
Pat Shurmur – Offensive line
Chuck Moller – Tight ends and offensive line (tackles)
Bill Harris – Defensive coordinator and defensive backs
Phil Zacharias – Defensive ends and special teams coordinator
Kent Baer – Inside and outside linebacker
Dave Tipton – Recruiting coordinator

References

Stanford
Stanford Cardinal football seasons
Stanford Cardinal football